Dave Gillespie was an American football coach.  He served as the head football coach at Wheaton College in Wheaton, Illinois for one season, in 1925, compiling a record of 1–7.

Head coaching record

References

Year of birth missing
Year of death missing
Wheaton Thunder football coaches